Yannick Ferreira Carrasco (born 4 September 1993) is a Belgian professional footballer who plays as a winger and wing-back for La Liga club Atlético Madrid and the Belgium national team.

He began his career with Monaco, where he scored 20 goals in 105 professional games, winning Ligue 2 in his first season and finishing runner-up in Ligue 1 in the second. In 2015, he joined La Liga side Atlético Madrid for a reported €20 million, scoring in the final as they were runners-up in the UEFA Champions League. After a two-year spell with Dalian Professional in the Chinese Super League, Carrasco returned to Atlético in early 2020 on a loan basis. In September 2020 it was announced that Carrasco would officially transfer to Atletico on a permanent basis and would sign a contract for four years.

Carrasco made his international debut for Belgium in April 2015. He played at the UEFA European Championship in 2016 and 2020, and was part of their squad that came third at the 2018 FIFA World Cup.

Personal life
Carrasco was born in Vilvoorde to a Portuguese father and Spanish mother. His father left the family when Yannick was still a child, leaving his mother, Carmen, to raise him and his brother Mylan. He has two younger half-siblings, Hugo and Celia. While initially known as "Ferreira Carrasco" at the time of his professional debut, he later chose to drop the paternal part of his Spanish-style double surname. Both his maternal grandparents are from the region of Andalusia; his maternal grandmother being from Seville, while his maternal grandfather being from Córdoba.

In 2017, Carrasco married former Miss Belgium Noémie Happart.

Club career

Monaco
Carrasco joined Monaco from Belgian club Genk in 2010. He made his professional debut on 30 July 2012 in the opening game of the Ligue 2 season against Tours, opening a 4–0 victory on the stage 
at the Stade Louis II via a free kick. On 13 April 2013, he scored both goals of a 2–0 league victory over Auxerre. In his debut campaign with the club, he appeared in 27 games and scored 6 goals as Monaco won promotion back to Ligue 1.

His first top-flight goal came on 5 October 2013 against Saint-Étienne, converting a James Rodríguez cross and helping Monaco to a 2–1 victory. He scored twice in the opening 10 minutes fifteen days later as Monaco drew 2–2 away to Sochaux; the team finished their first season back at the top as runners up to Paris Saint-Germain.

On 25 February 2015, he scored the last goal of Monaco's 3–1 away win at Arsenal in the last 16 first leg of the 2014–15 UEFA Champions League, after replacing Dimitar Berbatov in the 75th minute.

Atlético Madrid

On 10 July 2015, Atlético Madrid announced the signing of Carrasco on a five-year deal for a reported fee of €20 million. On 18 October, he scored his first goal for Atletico in a 2–0 away victory over Real Sociedad.

On 28 May 2016, as a half-time replacement for Augusto Fernández in the 2016 UEFA Champions League Final at the San Siro, Carrasco scored Atlético's 79th-minute equaliser against Real Madrid; his team lost in a penalty shoot-out. He was the first Belgian to score in a European Cup final.

On 15 October 2016, he scored his first professional hat-trick in a 7–1 rout of Granada CF.

Dalian Professional
On 26 February 2018, along with teammate Nicolás Gaitán, Carrasco moved to Chinese Super League newcomers Dalian Yifang (later rebranded as Dalian Professional), a club owned by Atléti's partial owner Dalian Wanda Group. He made his debut on 3 March in an 8–0 loss to Shanghai SIPG, and scored his first goal in his fourth match for the club on 31 March, in a 1–1 away draw with Henan Jianye, ending his club's season-opening three-game losing streak.

Return to Atlético Madrid 
On 31 January 2020, Carrasco returned to Atlético Madrid on loan until the end of the season. On 8 September 2020, he rejoined the club on a permanent basis, signing a four-year contract. On 21 November 2020, he scored the only goal in a 1–0 victory over Barcelona.

International career

Carrasco made his senior international debut in March 2015, as a 69th-minute substitute for Marouane Fellaini in a 5–0 win over Cyprus in UEFA Euro 2016 qualification. He was named in manager Marc Wilmots' squad for the final tournament. On 26 June, in the last 16 in Toulouse, he scored his first international goal to conclude a 4–0 win over Hungary, after replacing Dries Mertens in the second half.

Carrasco was included in the Belgian squad for the 2018 FIFA World Cup by manager Roberto Martínez. He made his debut in the opening group stage victory over Panama and was deployed as an attacking left wing back in a 3–4–3 formation.

Career statistics

Club

International

Scores and results list Belgium's goal tally first.

Honours
Monaco
Ligue 2: 2012–13

Atlético Madrid
La Liga: 2020–21
UEFA Europa League: 2017–18
UEFA Champions League runner-up: 2015–16

Belgium
FIFA World Cup third place: 2018

References

External links

Profile at the Atlético Madrid website

Yannick Ferreira Carrasco at Topforward

1993 births
Living people
Belgian people of Portuguese descent
Belgian people of Spanish descent
People from Vilvoorde
Belgian footballers
Association football wingers
K. Diegem Sport players
K.R.C. Genk players
AS Monaco FC players
Atlético Madrid footballers
Dalian Professional F.C. players
Ligue 2 players
Ligue 1 players
La Liga players
Chinese Super League players
Belgium youth international footballers
Belgium under-21 international footballers
Belgium international footballers
UEFA Euro 2016 players
2018 FIFA World Cup players
UEFA Euro 2020 players
2022 FIFA World Cup players
Belgian expatriate footballers
Belgian expatriate sportspeople in Monaco
Belgian expatriate sportspeople in Spain
Belgian expatriate sportspeople in China
Expatriate footballers in Monaco
Expatriate footballers in Spain
Expatriate footballers in China
Footballers from Flemish Brabant